The Jagannath Temple is a temple dedicated to the Hindu god Jagannath in Puri, Odisha, India.

Jagannath Temple may also refer to:

India
Jagannath Temple, Ahmedabad, Gujarat
Jagannath Temple, Alwar, Rajasthan
Jagannath Temple, Bangalore, Karnataka
Jagannath Temple, Baripada, Mayurbhanj, Odisha
Jagannath Temple, Chennai, Tamil Nadu
 Jagannath Temple, Kanyakumari, Tamil Nadu
Jagannath Temple, Delhi
Jagannath Temple, Dharakote, Odisha
Jagannath Temple, Gunupur, Odisha
Jagannath Temple, Hyderabad
Jagannath Temple, Koraput, Odisha
Jagannath Temple, Mohanpur, West Bengal
Jagannath Temple, Nayagarh, Odisha
Jagannath Temple, Puri, Odisha
Jagannath Temple, Ranchi, Jharkhand
Jagannath Temple, Rayagada, Odisha
Jagannath Temple, Thalassery, Kerala
Chhatia Bata, Jajpur, Odisha
Jagannath Temple, Surada, Odisha

Elsewhere 
Shri Jagannath Puri Temple, Inanda, KwaZulu-Natal, South Africa
Comilla Jagannath Temple, Comilla, Bangladesh
Jagannath Temple, Pabna, Bangladesh
Jagannath Temple, Sialkot, Pakistan

See also 
:Category:Temples dedicated to Jagannath
Jagannath (disambiguation)
Juggernaut (disambiguation)